Linyi North railway station is a railway station in Lanshan District, Linyi, Shandong, China. The station opened on 26 November 2019 with the initial section of the Rizhao–Lankao high-speed railway, between Qufu East and Rizhao.

Once complete, Linyi North will have sixteen platforms (eight islands).

References

Railway stations in Shandong
Railway stations in China opened in 2019
Railway stations in Linyi